"Impacto" is the first single by Puerto Rican reggaeton performer Daddy Yankee from his fifth studio album El Cartel: The Big Boss.  It was released on April 12, 2007 by El Cartel Records. "Impacto" was nominated for Song of the Year at the Premios Lo Nuestro 2008.  The official remix features American singer Fergie.

Song information
The song was produced by Scott Storch and reggaeton producer Tainy. There is also a remix featuring Fergie, which is also featured in the same album and features more spanglish lyrics than the original version. Additionally, the song is featured in the EA Sports game Madden 08, Rockstar game Grand Theft Auto IV and Harmonix Music Systems game Dance Central 2. Daddy Yankee made another remix of "Impacto" featuring the reggaeton group Casa de Leones.

Music video

According to an interview by Primer Impacto news, who were on the set of the remix version video, Daddy Yankee says there will be two videos, one for the remix featuring pop and R&B singer Fergie and a second for the original. The original video features many cities including London, Tokyo, New York, San Juan and Mexico City. The remix video includes bits and pieces from the original video, adding Fergie and her parts. According to Daddy Yankee, it was one of the most expensive music videos he had taken a part of at the time.

The video premiered on Total Request Live on  May 8, 2007, and reached number one. The remix has been viewed more than 40 million times on YouTube with the original being viewed more than three million times, adding up to more than 16 million views. The music video earned the Lo Nuestro Award for Video of the Year.

Track listing and formats
US CD promo
"Impacto" (album version)
"Impacto" (instrumental version)
"Impacto" (clean remix) (featuring Fergie)
"Impacto" (dirty remix) (featuring Fergie)

US CD single
"Impacto" (album version)
"Impacto" (remix) (featuring Fergie)
(B-side)
"Impacto" (music video)

Chart performance

Media appearances 
 Video games
 The song was used for 2008's Grand Theft Auto IV soundtrack.
 The song was used for 2007's Madden NFL 08 EA Trax.
 The remix version was used as a playable song in 2011's Dance Central 2.

 Other media
 The song was used for a 2007's Pepsi commercial.

References

External links
 

Fergie (singer) songs
Daddy Yankee songs
2007 singles
Record Report Pop Rock General number-one singles
Song recordings produced by Scott Storch
Spanish-language songs
Spanglish songs
Songs written by will.i.am
Songs written by Fergie (singer)
Songs written by Daddy Yankee
2007 songs
Interscope Records singles